'Urwa ibn al-Ward al-'Abasi (540–607 CE) was a pre-Islamic Arabic su'luk poet. He was a member of the Banu Abs tribe.

Life
Little is known about his life, but he had a reputation for being "the most generous of the ancient Arabs."

Poetry
Urwa was the most prolific of the su'luk poets.  Yaqub Ibn as-Sikkit wrote a commentary on his poetic diwan.  His most famous poem is preserved in the Asma'iyyat.  Some of his poetry expresses his love for Salma, his estranged wife who he divorced while drunk.  When he recovered, he fell into despair at what he had done.  His diwan was edited by Theodor Nöldeke, who published it as Die Gedichte des Urwa ibn Alward in 1864.

References
René Basset: Le Dîwân de ‘Orwa ben el Ward. Traduit et annoté par René Basset. Paris: Geuthner 1928. (Publications de la Faculté des Lettres d’Alger. Prémiere Série. Bulletin de correspondence africaine. Tome 62.) 

Theodor Nöldeke: Die Gedichte des ‘Urwa ibn al-Ward al-‘Abasi. Herausgegeben, übersetzt und erläutert von Theodor Nöldeke. In: Abhandlungen der Königlichen Gesellschaft der Wissenschaften. Historisch-philosophische Klasse 11 (1863) S. 231-321. (Auch als Einzeldruck in Göttingen: Dieterich 1863.)

Albert Socin: Die Dîwâne der Dichter Nâbiga, Urwa, Hâtim, ‘Alkama und Farazdak. In: Zeitschrift der Deutschen Morgenländischen Gesellschaft 31 (1877) S. 667-715.

Cultural portrayals
Urwa ibn al-Ward has been portrayed in a number of plays, films, and television series in the Arab world.  His association with the famous knight Antarah ibn Shaddad is because the two were from the same tribe, the Banu Abs.

1961: The film Antara ibn Shaddad, directed by Niazi Mostafa.

1978: The television series Urwa ibn al-Ward, directed by Salah Abu Hanud.

2012: The play Antarah ibn Shaddad, presented at the Ukazz Theater in Ta'if.

See also

Ta'abbata Sharran
Al-Shanfara

References

External links
Arabic Magazine: Urwa ibn al Ward: Reading His Ideal (in Arabic)

540 births
607 deaths
6th-century Arabic poets